The 2015 Oregon wildfires were an ongoing series of wildfires affecting parts of the U.S. state of Oregon.

August fire
It was fully contained by August 24. It was suspected to be human-caused. One firefighter was injured. Three aircraft were used, taking water from Henry Hagg Lake, which led to its closure for recreational purposes. An estimated  were part of the burn, and 60 firefighters were needed. Highway 26 was closed for several days.

Cornet-Windy Ridge fire
As of August 23, 2015, the fire was 80 percent contained.

Eldorado fire
As of August 23, 2015, the fire was 65 percent contained.

Stouts fire
As of August 23, 2015, the wildfire was 83 percent contained.

Willamina Creek fire
As of August 23, 2015, the fire was 20 percent contained.

Smoke in the Willamette Valley
Wildfire smoke from Washington and Oregon was blown west over western Oregon, including Portland and the rest of the Willamette Valley, on August 22–23, 2015.

See also

 2015 California wildfires
 2015 Washington state wildfires

References